Popendetta Rural LLG (Popondetta Rural LLG) is a local-level government (LLG) of Oro Province, Papua New Guinea.

Wards
06. Gewoto
07. Sewa
08. Isuga
09. Dobuduru
10. Sorovi
11. East Ambogo
80. Popondetta Urban

References

Local-level governments of Oro Province